Harry Brandon may refer to:
 Harry "Skip" Brandon (born 1941), former deputy assistant director in charge of counter-terrorism and national security at the Federal Bureau of Investigation
 Harry Brandon (footballer) (1870–1935), Scottish footballer

See also
 Henry Brandon (disambiguation)